The Jukambal were an indigenous Australian people located in northern New South Wales, Australia.

Name
The ethnonym Jukambal is form from the word juka, meaning 'no'.

Country
The traditional lands of the Jukambal stretched over an estimated , running from around Glen Innes in a northern and easterly direction, through New England, up to Drake, Tenterfield and Wallangarra. They dwelt east of the line connecting Tenterfield and Glen Innes.

People
The Jukambal were often thought of as part of another tribal group, the Ngarabal, but are now considered to have been a distinct society.

Medicine 
It was the general opinion of aborigines in this area that disease and sickness was rare before the coming of the whites, with tumors rare or unknown. The Jukambal even claimed rheumatism never struck until the colonials' advent. Knowledge about medicinal plants, often thought to have potent effects, was introduced to young men undergoing initiation at a Bora ceremonial. Some would become fully-fledged medicine men (Noonwaebah) thought to be invested with powers that could endanger others. The Jukambal though anyone who fell sick was exposed in his weak state to the secret enmity of enemies, and as a safeguard often the patient (dthikkae) would summon in several medicine men to examine his physical plight.

Corkwood, in which hyoscyamine is present, was as generally in eastern Australia exploited for its toxic properties. When stricken by drought, the Jukambal would draw water from the Angophora apple trees, rather than risk drinking water from impure sources. Fractures were set by binding the affected limb with two pieces of bark stripped from a Bugaibil tree, whose sap was believed to have curative properties. Snake bites even from the most venomous species rarely proved fatal, the poison being promptly sucked out, with the Jukambal also binding over the wound a ligature made from opossum (koobi) skin..

History
As late as 1855, people speaking the Jukambal language were encountered living on the Macintyre River.

Alternative names
 Jukambil
 Ukumbil, Ucumble
 Yacambal
 Yookumbul, Yookumbil, Yookumbill, Yoocumbill, Yookumble, Yoocomble
 Yukambal, Yukumbul, Yukumbil
 Yukumba

Source:

Notes

Citations

Sources

Aboriginal peoples of New South Wales